Events from the year 1931 in Taiwan, Empire of Japan.

Incumbents

Central government of Japan
 Prime Minister: Hamaguchi Osachi, Wakatsuki Reijirō, Inukai Tsuyoshi

Taiwan
 Governor-General – Ishizuka Eizō, Ōta Masahiro

Events

April
 6 April – The opening of Consulate-General of the Republic of China in Taihoku Prefecture.

Births
 1 August – Hsu Shui-teh, President of Examination Yuan (1996–2002).
 6 August – Hsu Li-teh, Vice Premier of the Republic of China (1993–1997).
 3 December – Liu Sung-pan, President of Legislative Yuan (1992–1999).

References

 
Years of the 20th century in Taiwan